The 1996 Shoprite bombing was a white-supremacist terrorist attack that took place on 24 December 1996 after bomb was detonated at a Shoprite (South Africa) supermarket in Worcester, South Africa killing 3 people and wounding several others. A second bomb placed in a tree down the street at a local pharmacy was also detonated, injuring 2 sitting nearby.

Planning and motive 
The four men involved in the bombings, who were all members of the Israel Vision religious sect, were Koper Myburgh, Cliff Barnard, Jan "Voetbol" van der Westhuizen and Stefaans Coetzee. Coetzee was 17 at the time of bombing. All four men were part of the Afrikaner nationalist, neo-Nazi, and white supremacist paramilitary organisation Afrikaner Weerstandsbeweging, or AWB for short.

Bombing 
On 24 December 1996, Coetzee walked into a Shoprite store and discreetly planted a bomb in a christmas tree decoration.

References 

Shoprite bombing, 1996
Shoprite bombing
Shoprite bombing
Shoprite bombing
Neo-Nazism in South Africa
1996 murders in South Africa
Shoprite bombing
Right-wing terrorist incidents
Marketplace attacks